Lust is the debut album by Belgian new beat band Lords of Acid, released in 1991.  The band had released several 12-inch singles prior to their full-length debut, and these songs ("I Sit on Acid" and "Hey Ho!") were already dance club hits.

Continuing with their outrageous sexually-explicit, always tongue-in-cheek, often humorous lyrical themes, Lust  had earned positive reviews from music critics, both in and out of the dance music community.  As the album's title implies, the tracks touch upon various sexually-related topics, including sadism and masochism ("Rough Sex"), breast size ("I Must Increase My Bust"), sex with aliens ("Spacy Bitch") and oral and anal sex ("I Sit on Acid", whose entire lyrical content consists of the chant "I wanna sit on your face").

"The Most Wonderful Girl", an ode to self-love and masturbation, also appeared on the soundtrack to the film Sliver.  The track "Hey Ho!" originally contained a sample of "Heigh-Ho" from the 1937 Walt Disney film Snow White and the Seven Dwarfs, however this sample was removed when the track appeared on this album most likely due to copyright issues.

The song "Let's Get High" features samples from Bill Cosby: Himself.

Lust has been re-issued twice: in 1996 (three bonus tracks added, "Paris France" and "Wet Dream" and "I Sit on Acid 96 Mix") and in 2001 in a "Stript" version, which presented the entire album with all vocals removed.

Track listing

Personnel
Praga Khan: Vocals, Synthesizers, Programming
Oliver Adams: Synthesizers, Programming
Jade 4 U: Vocals, Synthesizers, Programming

Production
Produced By Jade 4 U, Oliver Adams, Praga Khan, Agaric, Bhab & Jachri Praha
Mixed By Oliver Adams & Carl S. Johansen

References

1991 debut albums
Lords of Acid albums
Acid house albums
Caroline Records albums